Mourenx is a commune in the Pyrénées-Atlantiques department in south-western France.

History
A settlement of Mourengs existed in the eleventh century. A secular abbey existed, belonging to the Viscount of Béarn. In 1385 the village had 27 hearths.

Natural gas deposits were discovered in nearby Lacq in 1951. A new town was constructed in 1958 to provide accommodation for the workers required at the gas processing plant. The town was designed by architects and urbanists Coulon, Douillet and Maneval. It consisted of three groups of collective housing, three groups of family housing, all around a central area of support facilities.

The well-known French sociologist Henri Lefebvre carried out a study of Mourenx and its inhabitants at the time of its creation.

Population

See also
Communes of the Pyrénées-Atlantiques department

References

Communes of Pyrénées-Atlantiques
New towns in France
New towns started in the 1950s
Pyrénées-Atlantiques communes articles needing translation from French Wikipedia